Burnt Hill may refer to:
 Burnt Hill, Berkshire, a town in England
 Burnt Hill, New Zealand, a town in the Waimakariri District
 Burnt Hill (Delaware County, New York), a mountain
 Burnt Hill (Sullivan County, New York), a mountain

See also
 Burnt Hills, a mountain range in Santa Clara County, California
 Burnt Hills, New York, a hamlet